Carpodiptera is a genus of flowering plants in the family Malvaceae.

Species include:
Carpodiptera africana
Carpodiptera cubensis
Carpodiptera hexaptera	
Carpodiptera mirabilis	
 Carpodiptera ophiticola
Carpodiptera simonis

References

 
Malvaceae genera
Taxonomy articles created by Polbot